Kodaikanal is a former state assembly constituency in Dindigul district in Tamil Nadu, India.

Members of the Legislative Assembly

Election results

1962

1957

References

External links
 

Dindigul district
Former assembly constituencies of Tamil Nadu